Louise E. Simpson Stairs (March 24, 1892 - November 1975) was an American composer, organist, and pianist, who sometimes published under the pseudonym Sidney Forrest. She composed several cantatas, as well as piano and vocal works for children.

Stairs was born in Troupsburg, New York, to Alice Clare Stephens and Colonel Ellsworth Simpson. She married Alpheus Wade Stairs on September 3, 1912, and they had a daughter (Ruth). Little is known about Stairs’ education. Her music was published by Carl Fischer Music, Hall-Mack Co., Oliver Ditson, and Theodore Presser Co. Her compositions include:

Cantatas 

Choral Cantata
Infant Holy: Christmas Cantata
Light O’er Bethlehem: Christmas Cantata

Organ 

Advent Prayer
Arietta
Bright and Morning Star
He Shall Be Their Shepherd
Manger’s Gift
Master Call
Sabbath Morning
White Lillies

Piano 

Clocks in the Hall (with E. B. Marks)
Floating Clouds
Peach Blooms
Soldiers at Play
Sunday Morning
To Whit, To Whoo
Uncle Ben

Vocal 

“His Loving Call”
“Hush-a-bye Dolly”
“Finding Fairies”
“Lazy Frog”
“Lift Up Your Heads”
“Lord, Speak to Me” (text by Frances Ridley Havergal)
“Nest of Baby Bunnies”
“Robin Redbreast’s Song”
“Robin’s Song”
“Sailboats”
“So Longeth My Soul for Thee”
“There is an Eye that Never Sleeps”
“When the Robin Sings”
“Woodland Concert”

Hear works for organ by Louise E. Stairs

References 

American women composers
Pseudonyms
1892 births
1975 deaths
People from New York (state)